New Sensations is an American pornographic film studio. It is the parent company and sister-label of Digital Sin and HotwifeXXX.  New Sensations was founded in 1993; The first films it produced were the Video Virgins series, which ran from 1993 to 1998. In 2006 it was described by Reuters as one of the handful of studios that dominate the U.S. porn industry.

The studio has released several porn versions of popular media (usually titled "[original title]: A XXX Parody") including The X-Files, Scrubs, Scooby-Doo, The Flintstones, That '70s Show, The Office and 30 Rock.

Awards
1995 AVN Award – 'Best Amateur Series' for Video Virgins 
2000 AVN Award – 'Best All-Girl Release' for The Four Finger Club 2
2001 AVN Award – 'Best Special Effects' for Intimate Expressions
2001 AVN Award – 'Best Video Feature' for Dark Angels
2001 AVN Award – 'Best Videography' – Jake Jacobs & Nic Andrews for Dark Angels
2004 AVN Award – 'Best Solo Sex Scene' for Brook Ballentyne in Screaming Orgasms 11
2005 AVN Award – 'Best Foreign All-Sex Series' for Pleasures of the Flesh 
2005 AVN Award – 'Best Three-Way Sex Scene' – Dani Woodward, Barrett Blade & Kurt Lockwood for Erotic Stories: Lovers & Cheaters
2006 AVN Award – 'Best Videography' – Nic Andrews for Dark Angels 2: Bloodline
2008 AVN Award – 'Best Big Bust Series' for Big Natural Breasts
2009 AVN Award – 'Best New Series' for Ashlynn Goes to College
2009 AVN Award – 'Best Continuing Series' for Ashlynn Goes to College
2009 AVN Award – 'Best Vignette Series' for Cheating Wives Tales
2010 AVN Award for Best All-Sex Series for Addicted
2011 XBIZ Award – 'Peoples Choice – Porn Parody of the Year' for The Office: A XXX Parody 
2011 AVN Award – Best New Series – The Romance Series
2011 Feminist Porn Award – Steamiest Romantic Movie – A Little Part of Me
2011 XBIZ Award – Parody Studio of the Year
2011 XBIZ Award – 'Parody Release of the Year' for The Big Lebowski: A XXX Parody
2012 XBIZ Award – 'Feature Studio of the Year'
2012 XBIZ Award – 'Couples-Themed Release of the Year' for Love is a Dangerous Game
2012 AVN Award – 'Best Young Girl Series'
2013 XBIZ Award Nominee – 'Feature Movie of the Year' for Love, Marriage & Other Bad Ideas, The Friend Zone, and Torn; also 'All-Sex Release of the Year' for Glam-Core.  Other nominations include: 'Couples-Themed Release of the Year' for Friends With Benefits, The Friend Zone, Love, Marriage and Other Bad Ideas, Torn and Shared Wives; also 'Couples-Themed Line of the Year' for Swingers Series; 'All-Girl Release of the Year' for Against Her Will
2013 XBIZ Award – 'Studio of the Year'
2013 XBIZ Award – 'All-Sex Series of the Year' for Pretty Dirty
2013 XBIZ Award – 'Couples-Themed Release of the Year' for Torn
2013 XBIZ Award – 'Couples-Themed Line of the Year' for Romance Series
2013 XBIZ Award – 'Best Actor (Feature Movie)' – Steven St. Croix for Torn
2013 XBIZ Award – 'Best Actress (Couples-Themed Release)' – Remy LaCroix for Torn
2013 XBIZ Award – 'Best Actor (Couples-Themed Release)' – Richie Calhoun for Love, Marriage & Other Bad Ideas
2013 XBIZ Award – 'Best Actress (All-Girl Release)' – Sheridan Love for Against Her Will
2013 XBIZ Award – 'Screenplay of the Year' – Jacky St. James for Torn
2014 XBIZ Award – 'All-Sex Series of the Year' for Pretty Dirty
2014 XBIZ Award – 'Couples-Themed Line of the Year' for Romance Series 
2014 XBIZ Award – 'Screenplay of the Year' for The Temptation of Eve (Jacky St. James)
2015 XBIZ Award – 'Couples-Themed Release of the Year' for The Sexual Liberation of Anna Lee
2016 XBIZ Award – 'Vignette Release of the Year' for A Hotwife Blindfolded

Digital Sin

Digital Sin was founded by Scott Taylor in 1999. The company originally licensed other studios' films for CD-ROMs, and then DVDs; however, it now releases content produced by New Sensations. Digital Sin released an interactive DVD called Groupie Luv, which featured the rappers 50 Cent and Lloyd Banks.

Awards
2003 XRCO Award – 'Best Girl-Girl Scene' for Jenna Jameson & Carmen Luvana in My Plaything: Jenna Jameson 2
2004 AVN Award – 'Best Interactive DVD' for My Plaything: Jenna Jameson 2
2005 AVN Award – 'Best Interactive DVD' for Groupie Love
2008 AVN Award – 'Best Oral-Themed Release' for Face Full of Diesel
2007 AVN Award – 'Best Solo Release' for I Love Big Toys 2
2007 AVN Award – 'Best Interracial Series' for My Hot Wife Is Fucking Blackzilla
2009 AVN Award – 'Best Interactive DVD' for My Plaything: Ashlynn Brooke
2013 XBIZ Award Nomination – 'All-Sex Release of the Year' for Meet Blondie and The Innocence of Youth; Additional nominations include: 'All-Sex Series of the Year' for The Innocence of Youth and High Heels and Panties; also 'Vignette Series of the Year' for The Innocence of Youth
 2015 XBIZ Award – 'All-Sex Release of the Year' for Meet Carter Cruise
 2017 DVDEROTIK Award – 'GangBang of the Year' for My Sisters first GangBang 2

References

External links

American pornographic film studios
American companies established in 1993
Film production companies of the United States
1993 establishments in California
Companies based in Los Angeles
Chatsworth, Los Angeles